Radenko Varagić (born 23 September 1973) is a Serbian-Dutch basketball coach. He currently serves as a head coach for BAL Weert of the BNXT League.

Coaching career 
Born in Serbia, Varagić started his coaching career in 2015 with Ribnica and during 2017 to 2011, he worked for Kraljevo, Krusevac and Novi Sad. 

After a period in the youth academy of Red Star Belgrade, he moved to the Netherlands in 2014. On 13 September 2016, Varagić was appointed as head coach of BSW of the Dutch Basketball League (DBL). After the 2016–17 season, the club went bankrupt and was replaced by BAL, as he took over as head coach of the club's new DBL team.

In the 2020–21 season, he coached BAL to their first playoffs appearance after finishing in the eight place. On 2 May 2021, Varagić won the 2021 DBL Cup with his team after beating Yoast United in the final.

On 6 October 2022, Varagic was appointed as interim head coach of the Netherlands national team after the firing of Maurizio Buscaglia. He was already coaching Netherlands U-16 since 2019.

Personal 
Varagić received the Dutch nationality in 2022. He is married to Vesna and has six children.

Coaching record

Dutch Basketball League 

|-
| align="left"|BSW
| align="left" |2016–17
|28||4||24|||| align="center" |
|-
| align="left" |BAL
| align="left" |2017–18
|28||4||24|||| align="center" |
|-
| align="left" |BAL
| align="left" |2018–19
|34||5||29|||| align="center" |
|-
| align="left" |BAL
| align="left" |2019–20
|24||9||15|||| align="center" |
|-
| align="left" |BAL
| align="left" |2020–21
|21||12||9|||| align="center" | Quarterfinalist
|-
|-class="sortbottom"
| align="center" colspan=2|Career||||34||101||||

References

1973 births
Living people
Basketball Academie Limburg coaches
Serbian expatriate basketball people in the Netherlands
Serbian men's basketball coaches
Sportspeople from Belgrade